Bouroum-Bouroum is the capital of Bouroum-Bouroum Department in Poni Province, Burkina Faso. The main ethnic group is the Lobi.

References

Poni Province